Catherina "Katy" Gaalswyk Olson (October 24, 1928 – August 14, 2011) was a Minnesota politician and was a former member of the Minnesota House of Representatives from southwestern Minnesota.

Service in the Minnesota House
Olson was first elected in 1986 in the Democratic-Farmer-Labor Party's "firestorm" that swept through the region. The election gave Democrats unprecedented control of southwestern Minnesota for the next several election cycles. She was re-elected in 1988, 1990 and 1992. She represented the old District 28B and, later, District 22B, which included all or portions of Cottonwood, Jackson, Martin, Redwood, Watonwan and Brown counties, changing somewhat through redistricting in 1990.

While in the legislature, Olson was a member of the House Agriculture, Education, Rules and Legislative Administration, Transportation and Transit, Economic Development and Housing, and Energy committees, and of various sub-committees relevant to each area. She was chair of the Legislative Commission on the Economic Status of Women from 1991-1993. The commission has since evolved into the Office on the Economic Status of Women. She also served as an assistant majority leader during the 1993-1994 session under House Speaker Dee Long.

Background and community service
From the rural Trimont and Sherburn areas, Olson earned a reputation as a strong advocate for farmers, agricultural issues and education during her time in office. Prior to being elected to the House, she served on the Trimont School Board and, after her service in the legislature concluded, she served on the Minnesota State Board of Teaching and the Minnesota Region 9 Development Commission.

Olson and her husband, Robert, were the parents of five children. They had farmed in the Trimont area for many years.

References

External links 

Catherina Olson-obituary
Office on the Economic Status of Women

1928 births
2011 deaths
Farmers from Minnesota
People from Rock Valley, Iowa
People from Martin County, Minnesota
Democratic Party members of the Minnesota House of Representatives
School board members in Minnesota
Women state legislators in Minnesota
Luther College (Iowa) alumni
Minnesota State University, Mankato alumni
21st-century American women